Insurance Investigator is a 1951 American crime film directed by George Blair and written by Gertrude Walker. The film stars Richard Denning, Audrey Long, John Eldredge, Hillary Brooke, Reed Hadley and Jonathan Hale. The film was released on March 23, 1951, by Republic Pictures.

Plot

Cast    
Richard Denning as Tom Davison
Audrey Long as Nancy Sullivan
John Eldredge as John Hammond
Hillary Brooke as Addie Wilson
Reed Hadley as Chuck Malone
Jonathan Hale as Russell James
Roy Barcroft as Duke Wallace
Wilson Wood as Jimmy Marshall
William Tannen as 1st Hood
Phillip Pine as 2nd Hood
Crane Whitley as Chief Meyers
Ruth Lee as Miss Pringle
Patricia Knox as Hat Check Girl
M'liss McClure as Cigarette Girl
Maurice Samuels as Tony

References

External links
 

1951 films
1950s English-language films
American crime films
1951 crime films
Republic Pictures films
Films directed by George Blair
American black-and-white films
1950s American films